Mount Dora is an unincorporated community located in Union County, New Mexico, United States. Mount Dora had its own post office from April 10, 1908, until November 2, 2002. It was named Mount Dora by Senator Stephen W. Dorsey after his sister-in-law.

References

Unincorporated communities in Union County, New Mexico
Unincorporated communities in New Mexico